Luter is a surname. Notable people with the surname include:

Chip Luter (born 1985), American Baptist minister, son of Fred Luter
Claude Luter (1923–2006), French jazz clarinetist and saxophonist
Elizabeth W. Luter (born 1956), American resource person, wife of Fred Luter
Fred Luter (born 1956), American Baptist minister and church leader
Joseph W. Luter III (born 1939), American food magnate
Mick Luter (born 1978), American rapper

See also
Luther (surname)